The 1975 Georgia Bulldogs football team represented the Georgia Bulldogs of the University of Georgia during the 1975 NCAA Division I football season.

Schedule

Roster

Game summaries

Florida

References

Georgia
Georgia Bulldogs football seasons
Georgia Bulldogs football